Measure is the second album by Matt Pond PA, released in 2000.

Production
The album was produced by Brian McTear. Pond rewrote many of the songs during the recording sessions, eventually bringing in a drummer.

Critical reception
Exclaim! wrote that "the winning pop disc thrives on the honeyed tones of Pond's voice and poignant arrangements." The Philadelphia Daily News likened the "folky, string-drenched arrangements" to those of Jeremy Enigk. PopMatters called the album "aching, melancholic, orchestral pop that bordered on gloom and despair without crossing over into the realm of the ominous." In a review of the band's next album, The Green Fury, The A.V. Club deemed Measure "magnificent."

Track listing
 "Measure 1" – 4:12
 "The Sound and the Words" – 1:28
 "The Hollows" – 3:24
 "Green Grass" – 5:51
 "Measure 2" – 3:08
 "Sugar House" – 1:42
 "New Fall" – 4:38
 "Competition" – 2:34
 "Flying Through the Scenery" – 2:08
 "The Price of Spring" – 3:10
 "It's Over" – 1:49

Personnel
Josh Kramer – guitar, bass
Jim Hosetter – cello
Rosie McNamara-Jones – violin, backup vocals
Sean Byrne – drums, percussion
Matt Pond – vocals, guitar, keys
Julia Rivers – French horn
Justin DiFebbos – flute
Rebecca Cannon – vocals on "Sugar House"
Brian McTear – guitar, bass, keys, backup vocals, percussion

Technical personnel
Recorded and produced by Brian McTear at MinerStreet/CycleSound
Mastered by John Baker at Maja Audio Group

References

2000 albums
Matt Pond PA albums